Thijmen Jacobsz Hinlopen (also Tymen; Thymen; Hinloopen; 1572–1637), was one of the leaders of the Dutch merchant and whaling company of Noordsche Compagnie beginning in 1617 and participant in the New Netherland Company, interested in furs.  Thijmen was a prominent trader in corn from the Baltic carrying on trade to Genoa and Portugal.

He was the namesake of Cape Henlopen, Delaware and Hinlopen Strait.

Family
The Hinlopen family is said to have originated from Brabant. After moving to Amsterdam, several of the Hinlopens became wealthy during the Golden Age.

Thijmen married Anna Verlaer. Jan Jacobszoon Hinlopen was his nephew.

External links 
 Hinlopen family at the Dutch Wikipedia

References 

1572 births
1637 deaths
Dutch merchants
Businesspeople from Amsterdam